The 24th European Women's Artistic Gymnastics Championships were held from 18 April to 21 April 2002 in Patras.

Medalists

Medal table

Combined

Seniors

Juniors

Senior Results

Team competition
The team competition also served as qualification for the individual all-around and event finals. The top 8 teams are listed below.

All-around

Vault

Uneven bars

Balance beam

Floor

Junior Results

Team competition

All-around

Vault

Uneven bars

Balance beam

Floor

References 

 
 

2002
European Artistic Gymnastics Championships
2002 in European sport
Sports competitions in Patras
International gymnastics competitions hosted by Greece
2002 in Greek sport
2002 in Greek women's sport